Free Acres is an unincorporated community located along the border of Berkeley Heights in Union County and Watchung in Somerset County, in New Jersey, United States. Free Acres was created in 1910 as a social experiment by Bolton Hall, an Irish-born New York entrepreneur, reformer and follower of Leo Tolstoy.  Hall believed in economist Henry George's idea of single taxation, under which residents pay a land value tax to the community based on the value of the land alone, and in turn, the community pays a lump sum to the municipality.

Residents own their houses, but pay a lease for the land, which is owned collectively by the community. Free Acres contains a farmhouse and a spring-fed pool. Residents of Free Acres still pay tax to the Free Acres Association, which is now a more common version of the property tax, based on the value of the land and any improvements. The association maintains the community's streets and swimming pool, approves architectural changes to homes, and pays a lump sum in taxes to the two municipalities.

Among the early residents of Free Acres were author Thorne Smith and his wife Celia, and actor James Cagney and his wife Billie. It has been home to scientists who worked at the nearby Bell Labs Murray Hill.

See also 

 Commune
 Tragedy of the Commons

References

External links
 A history of Free Acres
 Historic Photos of Free Acres

Georgist communities
Watchung, New Jersey
Berkeley Heights, New Jersey
Unincorporated communities in Somerset County, New Jersey
Unincorporated communities in Union County, New Jersey
Unincorporated communities in New Jersey